Meriel may refer to:
Mériel, a commune in the French department of Val-d'Oise

People with the given name
Meriel Barham, musician
Meriel Forbes (1913–2000), English actress
Meriel Horson, British actress who play one of the women in the wood in The Dalek Invasion of Earth
Meriel Jones, actress who played Gwen in Noson Lawen
Meriel Lucas (fl. 1910s), English badminton player
Meriel Talbot (1866–1956), British public servant and women's welfare worker
Meriel Patricia Tufnell (1948–2002), jockey
Meriel Anne Watts, candidate in the 2002 New Zealand general election
Meriel Wingfield, wife of Arthur Chichester, 4th Baron Templemore

Fictional
Meriel Sawle, a character in the Adam Loveday series of books by Kate Tremayne
Meriel Vaughn, a character on Hollyoaks
Meriel, the daughter of Kenton Archer on The Archers

People with the surname
Gilbert Meriel (born 1986), soccer player from Tahiti

See also
Lady Jane Meriel Grosvenor, the daughter of Robert Grosvenor, 5th Duke of Westminster